Hilmar Thate (17 April 1931 – 14 September 2016) was a German actor. He appeared in 40 films and television shows between 1955 and 2016.

Filmography

References

External links

1931 births
2016 deaths
German male film actors
German male television actors
20th-century German male actors
21st-century German male actors
Members of the Academy of Arts, Berlin
People from Saxony-Anhalt